Geraniol 8-hydroxylase (Formerly , CYP76B6, G10H, CrG10H, SmG10H) is an enzyme with systematic name geraniol,NADPH:oxygen oxidoreductase (8-hydroxylating). This enzyme catalyses the following chemical reaction

 geraniol + NADPH + H+ + O2  (6E)-8-hydroxygeraniol + NADP+ + H2O

Geraniol 8-hydroxylase is a cytochrome P450 and therefore requires a partner cytochrome P450 reductase for functional expression.

References

External links 
 

EC 1.14.14